The Finnish ice hockey champions is a title awarded annually to the winning team of the top-tier ice hockey league in Finland, which currently is Liiga since 2013. The championship's present format did not take into effect until the league was originally formed for the 1975–76 season under the name of SM-liiga (preceded by SM-sarja). A team who wins the Finnish Championship is awarded the Kanada-malja ("Canada Bowl") trophy. The winner of the regular season receives the Harry Lindbladin muistopalkinto ("Harry Lindblad Memorial Trophy").

Winners
Until 1933 the championship was played as a Cup series. From the 1933–34 season it was played as a League series. Playoffs were introduced during the 1975–76 season.

1927–1933

1933–1975

1975–2022

Clubs by titles

Cities by championships

See also
 Finnish Hockey Hall of Fame
 Finnish Cup
 Aaro Kivilinna Memorial Trophy

References

Sources
 passionhockey.com | seasons archives
 eliteprospects.com | teams database

Ice hockey in Finland
Ice hockey champions
Finnish ice hockey champions